Ethyl decadienoate, also known as pear ester, is an organic chemical compound used in flavors and perfumery for its pear-like taste and odor.

Occurrence and preparation
Ethyl decadienoate is found in apples, Bartlett pears, Concord grapes, beer, pear brandy and quince.

It can also be prepared synthetically from 1-octyn-3-ol or from ethyl propiolate.

Uses
Ethyl decadienoate is used in natural flavors and fragrances for its intense fruity flavor.  In the United States, as a food additive it is listed as generally recognized as safe (GRAS).

References

Ethyl esters
Food additives
Flavors
Fatty acid esters